Dinabandhu Andrews College (Bengali: দীনবন্ধু এণ্ড্ৰুজ কলেজ) is a college affiliated to the University of Calcutta, situated in Garia, South 24 Parganas. It was established in 1956 and named after Rev. Charles Freer Andrews, a renowned Christian missionary, educationist, and philanthropist.

This Co-educational college has nearly 5000 students and offers Courses in 15 subjects in Science, Arts and Commerce stream along with General courses. Not only UG courses, this college also offers post graduation in subjects like Electronics and Zoology.

History

Dinabandhu Andrews College was established in the year 1956 and the college is named after freedom fighter Rev. Charles Freer Andrews.

The college was constituted at the fringe of the semi-urban zone of South 24 Parganas district with an aim to disseminate the scope of higher education to a huge number of children of the displaced persons from erstwhile East Pakistan, presently Bangladesh.

Departments

Science
Botany: B.Sc. (Hons.)
Physics: B.Sc. (Hons.)
Chemistry: B.Sc. (Hons.)
Mathematics: B.Sc. (Hons.)
Electronics: B.Sc. (Hons.), M.Sc.
Zoology: B.Sc. (Hons.), M.Sc.
Microbiology: B.Sc. (Hons.)
Sericulture: B.Sc. (Hons.)

Arts and Commerce
Bengali: B.A (Hons.)
English: B.A (Hons.)
History: B.A (Hons.)
Geography: B.A (Hons.)
Political Science: B.A (Hons.)
Philosophy: B.A (Hons.)
Accounting & Finance: B.Com. (Hons.)

See also 
List of colleges affiliated to the University of Calcutta
Education in India
Education in West Bengal

References

External links

Universities and colleges in Kolkata
University of Calcutta affiliates
Educational institutions established in 1956
Commerce colleges in India
1956 establishments in West Bengal